Daniel Vilhelm Carlson (born January 23, 1995) is an American football placekicker for the Las Vegas Raiders of the National Football League (NFL). He played college football at Auburn, where he became the SEC's all-time leading scorer and was selected by the Minnesota Vikings in the fifth round of the 2018 NFL Draft. Released by Minnesota during his rookie season, Carlson joined the Raiders and has twice led the league in scoring. He is currently the third most accurate kicker in the NFL.

Early life
Carlson was born on January 23, 1995, to Hans and Jodie Carlson. Carlson has an older brother named Nils and a younger brother Anders who is the kicker at Auburn.

High school career
Carlson attended The Classical Academy before college.

College career
Under head coach Gus Malzahn, Carlson never missed an extra point in his collegiate career with the Auburn Tigers. He is the all-time leading scorer in SEC football history with 480 career points and was a three time member of the All SEC Team First Team.

Collegiate statistics

Professional career

Minnesota Vikings
Carlson was drafted by the Minnesota Vikings in the fifth round (167th overall) of the 2018 NFL Draft. He was one of two kickers to be drafted that year, the other being Jason Sanders by the Miami Dolphins.

In the offseason, he competed with veteran kicker Kai Forbath. Carlson won the job, and Forbath was released by the team on August 20, 2018. He made his NFL debut in the season opener against the San Francisco 49ers and converted all three extra point attempts and one field goal attempt. On September 16, 2018, in a game against the Green Bay Packers, Carlson missed one field goal in regulation and two in overtime, resulting in a 29–29 tie. The following day, Carlson was waived and replaced by veteran Dan Bailey.

Oakland / Las Vegas Raiders

Carlson was signed by the Oakland Raiders on October 23, 2018, after the team released fellow rookie kicker Matt McCrane. In his Raiders' debut in Week 8, he converted all four extra point attempts in a 42–28 loss to the Indianapolis Colts. In Week 11, Carlson made two extra points and three field goals, including a 35-yard game winner as time expired, in a 23–21 win over the Arizona Cardinals, earning him AFC Special Teams Player of the Week.

Carlson went on to convert 94% of his field goal attempts for the Raiders in 2018, setting a new team record.

On April 16, 2020, Carlson was re-signed to a one-year contract. During the 2020 offseason, Carlson switched his jersey number from 8 to 2 in order to allow quarterback Marcus Mariota to wear number 8. In Week 1 against the Carolina Panthers, Carlson was a perfect 4 for 4 on his extra point and field goal attempts, including a career long 54-yard field goal, during the 34–30 win.  He was named the AFC Special Teams Player of the Week for his performance in Week 1. Carlson was named the AFC Special Teams Player of the Month for his performance in December.

The Raiders placed a second-round restricted free agent tender on Carlson on March 17, 2021. He signed the tender on April 29. In Week 2, Carlson converted all four field goal attempts and both extra-point attempts in a 26-17 win over the Steelers, earning AFC Special Teams Player of the Week. In Week 12 on Thanksgiving Day, Carlson went 3-3 on extra points and 5-5 on field goals in a 36-33 Raiders victory over the Dallas Cowboys, including a career-long 56-yarder to take a late lead in the 4th quarter and a 29-yarder to win the game in overtime. His Thanksgiving Day performance earned him another AFC Special Teams Player of the Week honor, a feat only two other kickers had achieved at that point in the season.

On December 9, 2021, Carlson signed a four-year, $18.4 million extension with the Raiders, making him the third highest-paid kicker in the NFL.

Down the stretch of the 2021 season, Carlson's kicking performance would become crucial for the Raiders. In week 15 against the Cleveland Browns, Carlson would make all three of his field goal attempts, the last of which being a 48-yard field goal that won the game for the Raiders. In week 17 against the Indianapolis Colts, Carlson successfully converted all three of his field goal attempts and both of his extra-point attempts to account for 11 of the 23 points the Raiders scored in the contest, including the game-winning field goal. Carlson's performance in week 17 tied him with Nick Folk for the league lead in field goals made and field goals attempted in the 2021 season. In Week 18, Carlson made five field goals in the final game of the 2021 regular season against the Los Angeles Chargers, including a game-winning 47-yard attempt as time expired in overtime. The Raiders would go on to clinch a playoff spot and eliminate the Chargers from playoff contention.

NFL career statistics

Regular season

Postseason

Personal life
Carlson is a Christian. Carlson married Katherine Barker on January 13, 2018, in Birmingham, Alabama. The two met during their time at Auburn. They have two children.

References

External links
Las Vegas Raiders bio
 Auburn Tigers bio

1995 births
Living people
American football placekickers
Auburn Tigers football players
Minnesota Vikings players
Oakland Raiders players
Players of American football from Colorado Springs, Colorado